is a former Japanese football player. He is the currently assistant manager J1 League club of Kawasaki Frontale.

Club career
Terada started playing football at the junior youth setup of Japan Soccer League side Nissan Motors (current Yokohama F. Marinos). Then he played for and was educated at Yokosuka High School and Tokai University. At the university, he contribute to the Japan team winning the 1995 Summer Universiade held in Fukuoka. After the graduation, he nearly signed with Yokohama Marinos but the club pulled out when a problem was found in his neck at the medical check.

After spending a year unattached, he signed with J2 League side Kawasaki Frontale in 1999 as an anchoring midfielder. He immediately became a regular starter and contributed to the club winning the J2 Championship. In May 2000, he damaged his knee ligament that, along with other injuries, sidelined him for two and half years.

He was converted to a central defender and established himself as a linchpin of the Kawasaki defence.

He retired from the game at the end of the 2010 season.

National team career
Terada earned his first international cap on May 27, 2008 in a friendly against Paraguay. Being 32 years and 339 days old, he became the fourth eldest to make a national team debut for Japan. He also played at 2010 World Cup qualification and 2011 Asian Cup qualification. He played 6 games for Japan until 2009.

Club statistics

National team statistics

National team career statistics

Appearances in major competitions

References

External links
 
 
 Japan National Football Team Database
 
 Kawasaki Frontale official

1975 births
Living people
Tokai University alumni
Association football people from Mie Prefecture
Japanese footballers
Japan international footballers
J1 League players
J2 League players
Kawasaki Frontale players
Association football defenders